"Move Mania" is a song by German production group Sash! featuring American singer Shannon. It was released on 2 November 1998 through Club Tools and the Mighty label as the third single from their second studio album, Life Goes On (1998). It was a hit in several European countries.

Critical reception
Jon O'Brien from AllMusic stated that "disco diva" Shannon "adds a touch of class" to the "uplifting" song.

Chart performance
"Move Mania" reached the top 10 in Finland, Italy, and the United Kingdom. In the latter country, the single peaked at number eight in its first week at the UK Singles Chart, on 22 November 1998. Additionally, it was a top-20 hit in Denmark and Ireland. On the Eurochart Hot 100, "Move Mania" peaked at number 23 in December 1998.

Music video
A music video was produced to promote the single, directed by Oliver Sommer. He also directed the videos for "Encore une fois", "Stay", "Ecuador" and "La Primavera".

Track listing

Credits
 Design – M. Kowalkowski
 Cover photography – Gaby Gerster 
 Shannon photography – Judy Schiller 
 Producer – Sash!, Tokapi 
 Vocals – Shannon 
 Written by Ralf Kappmeier, Sascha Lappessen, Thomas Alisson

Charts

Weekly charts

Year-end charts

References

External links
 
 Sash! Feat. Shannon – Move Mania

1998 singles
1998 songs
Multiply Records singles
Music videos directed by Oliver Sommer
Sash! songs
Shannon (singer) songs